Longitarsus andalusicus is a species of beetle from the Chrysomelidae family that is endemic to Andalusia, Spain, from which it takes its name.

References

A
Beetles described in 1973
Endemic fauna of Spain
Beetles of Europe